Geplak is an Indonesian sweet snack, originating from Java, made from equal parts coarsely grated coconut and sugar, often brightly colored. Some versions include rice flour, citrus leaves and/or pumpkin. Geplak is mainly produced in Bantul, a city in Yogyakarta, Indonesia.

References

Javanese cuisine
Foods containing coconut
Confectionery
Kue